Bozhin Georgiev Laskov ((15 February 1922 – 31 March 2007) was a naturalised Slovak association football player of Bulgarian descent and origin, who played as a striker, noted for his tall stature, impressive physique and great heading. In addition, post-retirement Laskov served as a otorhinolaryngologist and a trained Bulgarian Orthodox priest. After 1946, he lived and worked in Czechoslovakia and is counted among Bulgaria's and Slovakia's best footballers of the era.

Biography
He graduated from the Sofia Seminary, from where his nickname Popeto (Попето; "the little priest") stems. His youth team was FC Pobeda from the Sofia neighbourhood of Orlandovtsi, for which he played in 1939–1940. In 1940, Laskov moved to PFC Levski Sofia and featured for their senior team between 1941 and 1946 as their number 9 striker. Laskov appeared in 56 Bulgarian Championship matches, scoring the remarkable 40 goals. In 46 Bulgarian Cup matches, he scored 21 times; he also appeared in 9 international games, scoring 5 goals, as well as 35 other games with 24 goals on his name. During his stay with Levski, Laskov won the Bulgarian Championship twice (in 1942 and 1946), the Bulgarian Cup three times (in 1942, 1946 and 1947) and the Sofia Championship four times (in 1942, 1943, 1945 and 1946). For the Bulgaria national football team, his tally stands at 8 matches and 2 goals. At the 1946 Balkan Cup in Tirana, Albania, he was proclaimed the best footballer of the Balkans. Reportedly, France Football also deemed him the best footballer in Europe later on.

On 15 February 1946, Laskov immigrated to Brno, Czechoslovakia, where he studied medicine at the Masaryk University and played for SK Židenice, the modern 1. FC Brno. In 1947, he moved to Bratislava, where he married a Slovak beautician and was granted Czechoslovak citizenship. In Bratislava, he played for ŠK Slovan Bratislava between 1947 and 1952, winning the Czechoslovak First League in 1949, 1950 and 1951. In Czechoslovakia, he has also played for FK Inter Bratislava (then Červená Hviezda) and TTS Trenčín, until 1960. In the Czechoslovak Championship, he played a total of 169 games, of which 98 (with 48 league goals) for Slovan; he also featured in 3 games for the Czechoslovakia national football team. He was awarded several fair play prizes in Czechoslovakia. Later on, he worked as a manager, managing FK Inter Bratislava, FC Spartak Trnava and Trenčín. He also served as a professional physician specialized in otolaryngology and was an active member of the Bulgarian association in Slovakia.

Laskov died in Bratislava on 31 March 2007.

Honours

Levski Sofia

Bulgarian champion – 1942, 1946, 1947
Bulgarian Cup – 1942, 1946, 1947
Sofia Championship – 1942, 1943, 1945, 1946

Individual

France Football Best player of Europe – 1949
Best player of the Balkans – 1946

SK Slovan Bratislava

Czechoslovak champion – 1949, 1950, 1951

Bulgaria

 1946 Balkan Cup – Fourth place
 1947 Balkan Cup – Fourth place

References

External links 
 
 Profile at LevskiSofia.info

1922 births
2007 deaths
Bulgarian footballers
Czechoslovak footballers
Footballers from Sofia
PFC Levski Sofia players
FC Zbrojovka Brno players
ŠK Slovan Bratislava players
FK Inter Bratislava players
TTS Trenčín players
Bulgarian Orthodox priests
Bulgaria international footballers
Czechoslovakia international footballers
Dual internationalists (football)
Bulgarian surgeons
Otolaryngologists
Slovak surgeons
Bulgarian football managers
Czechoslovak football managers
Bulgarian emigrants to Czechoslovakia
Masaryk University alumni
Slovak people of Bulgarian descent
FC Spartak Trnava managers
People from Sofia City Province
21st-century Eastern Orthodox priests
20th-century Bulgarian physicians
21st-century Bulgarian physicians
Association football forwards